The Yorkshire Waterways Museum  was a multi-award-winning museum in Goole, East Riding of Yorkshire, England.

Its mission was to 'Use the heritage, arts and environment of the Yorkshire waterways as a resource for learning and regeneration'. The museum also hosted a Tom Pudding hoist which is grade II listed. This allowed little tub boats carrying coal from South Yorkshire to be unloaded at Goole Docks and put into ocean-going vessels.

Liquidation
In early May 2019 it was announced that, as a consequence of ongoing funding shortfalls, the Museum and its associated charity, The Sobriety Project, were insolvent and that the Museum would close on 15 May.

References

External links

 Museum website

Museums in the East Riding of Yorkshire
Maritime museums in England
Canal museums in England